Ralph C. Merkle (born February 2, 1952) is a computer scientist and mathematician. He is one of the inventors of public-key cryptography, the inventor of cryptographic hashing, and more recently a researcher and speaker on cryonics.

Contributions
While an undergraduate, Merkle devised Merkle's Puzzles, a scheme for communication over an insecure channel, as part of a class project. The scheme is now recognized to be an early example of public key cryptography. He co-invented the Merkle–Hellman knapsack cryptosystem, invented cryptographic hashing (now called the Merkle–Damgård construction based on a pair of articles published 10 years later that established the security of the scheme), and invented Merkle trees. The Merkle–Damgård construction is at the heart of many hashing algorithms. While at Xerox PARC, Merkle designed the Khufu and Khafre block ciphers, and the Snefru hash function.

Career
Merkle was the manager of compiler development at Elxsi from 1980. In 1988, he became a research scientist at Xerox PARC. In 1999 he became a nanotechnology theorist for Zyvex. In 2003 he became a Distinguished Professor at Georgia Tech, where he led the Georgia Tech Information Security Center. In 2006 he returned to the San Francisco Bay Area, where he has been a senior research fellow at IMM, a faculty member at Singularity University, and a board member of the Alcor Life Extension Foundation. He was awarded the IEEE Richard W. Hamming Medal in 2010. He is active in the field of molecular manipulation and self-replicating machines and has published books on the subject.

Personal life
Ralph Merkle is a grandnephew of baseball star Fred Merkle; son of Theodore Charles Merkle, director of Project Pluto; and brother of Judith Merkle Riley, a historical writer. Merkle is married to Carol Shaw, the video game designer best known for the 1982 Atari 2600 game, River Raid.

Merkle is on the board of directors of the cryonics organization Alcor Life Extension Foundation.

Merkle appears in the science fiction novel The Diamond Age, involving nanotechnology.

Awards
 1996 Paris Kanellakis Award (from the ACM) for the Invention of Public Key Cryptography.
 1998 Feynman Prize in Nanotechnology for computational modeling of molecular tools for atomically-precise chemical reactions
 1999 IEEE Koji Kobayashi Computers and Communications Award
 2000 RSA Award for Excellence in Mathematics for the invention of public key cryptography.
 2008 International Association for Cryptographic Research (IACR) fellow for the invention of public key cryptography.
 2010 IEEE Hamming Medal for the invention of public key cryptography
 2011 Computer History Museum Fellow "for his work, with Whitfield Diffie and Martin Hellman, on public key cryptography."
 2011 National Inventors Hall of Fame, for the invention of public key cryptography
 2012 National Cyber Security Hall of Fame inductee

References

References
 Ralph C. Merkle, Secrecy, authentication, and public key systems (Computer science), UMI Research Press, 1982, .
 Robert A. Freitas Jr., Ralph C. Merkle, Kinematic Self-Replicating Machines, Landes Bioscience, 2004, .
 Paul Kantor (Ed), Gheorghe Mureşan (Ed), Fred Roberts (Ed), Daniel Zeng (Ed), Frei-Yue Wang (Ed), Hsinchun Chen (Ed), Ralph Merkle (Ed), "Intelligence and Security Informatics" : IEEE International Conference on Intelligence and Security Informatics, ISI 2005, Atlanta, GA, US, May 19–20, ... (Lecture Notes in Computer Science), Springer, 2005, .
 Interview at Google Videos in the Death in the Deep Freeze documentary (August 2, 2006)
 Nova Southeastern University, Nanotechnology Expert Ralph Merkle to Speak on "Life and Death" (August 2008)

External links

 Oral history interview with Martin Hellman from 2004, Palo Alto, California. Charles Babbage Institute, University of Minnesota, Minneapolis. Hellman describes his invention of public key cryptography with collaborators Whitfield Diffie and Ralph Merkle at Stanford University in the mid-1970s. He also relates his subsequent work in cryptography with Steve Pohlig (the Pohlig–Hellman system) and others.

1952 births
Living people
American cryptographers
American people of Swiss descent
Cryonicists
Modern cryptographers
American nanotechnologists
Georgia Tech faculty
20th-century American inventors
International Association for Cryptologic Research fellows
Scientists at PARC (company)
Computer security academics